The Tupolev ANT-10 (also known as the R-7) was a prototype single-engined light bomber/reconnaissance aircraft of the 1930s. Only a single example was built, the Polikarpov R-5 being preferred.

Development and design

In 1928, the design bureau led by Nikolai Nikolaevich Polikarpov produced the R-5 to replace the R-1, an unlicensed copy of the Airco DH.9A, which was the Soviet Union's standard light reconnaissance aircraft/bomber. As a response, the design bureau led by Andrei Tupolev produced a rival replacement for the R-1, based on Tupolev's earlier Tupolev R-3. Like the R-3, the new design, the ANT-10 was a single-engined sesquiplane with a duralumin structure, but with a much larger upper wing (based on that of the I-4 fighter). Like the R-5, it was powered by an imported BMW VI engine. It could carry 500 kg (1,100 lb) of bombs in an internal bomb-bay.

The ANT-10 (which received the Soviet Air Force designation R-7) made its first flight on 30 January 1930, but its performance was little better than the R-5, while the R-5's wooden structure was advantageous at a time of metal shortages. The type was therefore abandoned later in the year in favour of the R-5.

Specifications

See also

Notes

References

 Duffy, Paul and Andrei Kandalov. Tupolev,: The Man and His Aircraft. Shrewsbury, UK: Airlife Publishing, 1996. .
 Gunston, Bill. The Osprey Encyclopedia of Russian Aircraft 1875–1995. London:Osprey, 1995. .

1930s Soviet military reconnaissance aircraft
ANT-10
Sesquiplanes
Single-engined tractor aircraft
Aircraft first flown in 1930